
Piotrków County is a unit of territorial administration and local government (powiat) in Łódź Voivodeship, central Poland. It came into being on January 1, 1999, as a result of the Polish local government reforms passed in 1998. Its administrative seat is the city of Piotrków Trybunalski, although the city is not part of the county (it constitutes a separate city county).

In 2006, its total population was 90,227, made up of 6,387 in Sulejów and a rural population of 83,840.

Neighbouring counties
Apart from the city of Piotrków Trybunalski, Piotrków County is also bordered by Łódź East County to the north, Tomaszów Mazowiecki County and Opoczno County to the east, Radomsko County to the south, Bełchatów County to the west, and Pabianice County to the north-west.

Administrative division
The county is subdivided into 11 gminas (two urban-rural and nine rural). These are listed in the following table, in descending order of population.

References
Polish official population figures 2006

 
Land counties of Łódź Voivodeship
States and territories established in 1999